Bazzano is a frazione of the comune (municipality) of Valsamoggia in the Metropolitan City of Bologna in the Italian region Emilia-Romagna, located about  west of Bologna. It was an independent commune until 2014.

In this frazione [hamlet] of Valsamoggia, the painter Antonino Sartini  died in 1954.

References 

Cities and towns in Emilia-Romagna